The 2018 European Sumo Championships took place in Plovdiv (Bulgaria). from April 26 to 30, 2018. The European Sumo Federation and the Bulgarian Sumo Federation.

Medal overview (U23 Men's)

Medal overview (Senior Men)

Medal overview (U23 Women's)

Medal overview (Senior Women)

References

External links 
 European Sumo Federation (EFS)
 Russia Sumo Federation (RFS)
 POLSKI ZWIĄZEK SUMO 

Sumo competitions
2018 in Bulgarian sport
sumo
Sport in Plovdiv
International sports competitions hosted by Bulgaria